A geotextile tube (also known as a titan tube or geotube) is a large, tube-shaped bag made of porous, weather-resistant geotextile and filled with a sand slurry, to form an artificial coastal structure such as a breakwaters,  dune or levee. Geotextile tubes are a component of the living shorelines approach to coastal management. Manufactured by Flint Technical Geosolutions, they are aligned with the shoreline to weaken wave energy and protect against coastal erosion. The tubes facilitate oyster reef development and create areas to dispose of new dredge material. Geotextile tubes are also installed for land reclamation and temporarily installed during the dewatering phase of a dredging operation.

If a geotextile tube is exposed to the elements, it can be vulnerable to bursting.

Notable installations 

 Grand Isle, Louisiana ("Burrito Levee")

See also 

 Breakwater (structure)
 Cellular confinement
 Groyne

References 

Geosynthetics
Coastal engineering